"I Remember You" is the second single from Denine. The song was originally released on the compilation album Viper's Freestyle Hit Parade, the Metropolitan Recording Corporation label.

The song was released in 1993 and was re-released on cassette format. In 1994, the song peaked at No. 16 on the Bubbling Under Hot 100 Singles chart in Billboard Magazine.

Track listing
12" single

Chart

References

1993 singles
1993 songs
Freestyle music songs
American electronic songs